45 R.P.M. Club is the first of four Japan-exclusive EPs by A-ha. Like the other three EPs, it is quite rare due to being only released in Japan. It reached #6 on the Japanese albums chart. Tracks 1 and 2 were included on the 2010 deluxe edition of the album Hunting High and Low (track 1 as a download-only bonus track) and all tracks were included on the 2015 expanded edition of the album Hunting High and Low.

Track listing

Personnel
Morten Harket – vocals
Magne Furuholmen – keyboards
Pål Waaktaar – guitars

References

 	   

A-ha albums
1985 EPs
Warner Records EPs